Lost Hills (formerly, Lost Hill) is a census-designated place (CDP) in Kern County, California, United States. The population was 2,412 at the 2010 census, up from 1,938 at the 2000 census. About 75% of the population is engaged in agricultural positions.

Geography

It stands on the east bank of the California Aqueduct. Interstate 5 is located near, but not adjacent, to Lost Hills. The town is at the intersection of State Route 46 and Lost Hills Road. The enormous Lost Hills Oil Field, which is sixth largest by remaining reserves in California, is west and northwest of town, extending about  along the range of the low Lost Hills Range, for which the town was named.

Climate
According to the Köppen Climate Classification system, Lost Hills has a semi-arid climate, abbreviated "BSk" on climate maps.

History
The Lost Hills post office opened in 1911, closed in 1912, re-opened in 1913 (having transferred from Cuttens), and moved in 1937. At one time, the post office was a small rented room, in Edmondson's cafe and bar. Later it was a small mobile-home size building.

Paramount Farms built a new park and housing development in Lost Hills in the early 2000s.

Demographics

2010
At the 2010 census Lost Hills had a population of 2,412. The racial makeup of Lost Hills was 132 (5.5%) White, 5 (0.2%) African American, 1 (0.0%) Native American, 17 (0.7%) Asian, 1 (0.0%) Pacific Islander, 2,232 (92.5%) from other races, and 24 (1.0%) from two or more races. Hispanic or Latino of any race were 2,354 persons (97.6%).

The whole population lived in households, no one lived in non-institutionalized group quarters and no one was institutionalized.

There were 448 households, 353 (78.8%) had children under the age of 18 living in them, 288 (64.3%) were opposite-sex married couples living together, 50 (11.2%) had a female householder with no husband present, 83 (18.5%) had a male householder with no wife present. There were 51 (11.4%) unmarried opposite-sex partnerships, and 2 (0.4%) same-sex married couples or partnerships. 9 households (2.0%) were one person and 3 (0.7%) had someone living alone who was 65 or older. The average household size was 5.38. There were 421 families (94.0% of households); the average family size was 5.02.

The age distribution was 970 people (40.2%) under the age of 18, 356 people (14.8%) aged 18 to 24, 730 people (30.3%) aged 25 to 44, 295 people (12.2%) aged 45 to 64, and 61 people (2.5%) who were 65 or older. The median age was 22.6 years. For every 100 females, there were 134.6 males. For every 100 females age 18 and over, there were 147.3 males.

There were 469 housing units at an average density of 84.3 per square mile, of the occupied units 178 (39.7%) were owner-occupied and 270 (60.3%) were rented. The homeowner vacancy rate was 2.7%; the rental vacancy rate was 1.8%. 976 people (40.5% of the population) lived in owner-occupied housing units and 1,436 people (59.5%) lived in rental housing units.

2000
At the 2000 census there were 1,938 people, 346 households, and 320 families in the CDP. The racial makeup of the CDP was 18.6% White, 2.6% Black or African American, 1.6% Native American, 0.1% Asian, 71.83"% from other races, and 5.3% from two or more races. 96.8% of the population were Hispanic or Latino of any race.
Of the 346 households 70.2% had children under the age of 18 living with them, 74.0% were married couples living together, 6.4% had a female householder with no husband present, and 7.5% were non-families. 3.8% of households were one person and 0.9% were one person aged 65 or older. The average household size was 5.60 and the average family size was 5.22.

The age distribution was 39.1% under the age of 18, 17.3% from 18 to 24, 30.9% from 25 to 44, 10.7% from 45 to 64, and 2.1% 65 or older. The median age was 22 years. For every 100 females, there were 139.0 males. For every 100 females age 18 and over, there were 161.6 males.

The median household income was $31,875 and the median family income  was $29,402. Males had a median income of $17,804 versus $12,885 for females. The per capita income for the CDP was $8,317. About 26.4% of families and 30.6% of the population were below the poverty line, including 36.5% of those under age 18 and 25.8% of those age 65 or over.

References

External links

 City-Data.com site

Census-designated places in Kern County, California
Census-designated places in California